Guilford Township is one of twelve townships in Hendricks County, Indiana, United States. As of the 2010 census, its population was 27,844.

History
The Joel Jessup Farm, Noah and Hannah Hadley Kellum House, Kellum-Jessup-Chandler Farm, and Sugar Grove Meetinghouse and Cemetery are listed on the National Register of Historic Places.

An unnamed Black settlement existed in Guilford Township beginning in the 19th century. Several black families lived in the area between Plainfield and Mooresville and established a non-denominational church along White Lick Creek, as well as a colored school before 1870.

Geography
The streams of Black Creek, Clarks Creek, Guilford Branch, Hendricks Creek, Leg Creek, Middle Creek, Moore Creek, Penns Run, Rail Run, Rock Creek, Rogers Creek and West Fork Hendricks Creek run through this township.

Cities and towns
 Plainfield (vast majority)

Unincorporated towns
 Friendswood
 Joppa
(This list is based on USGS data and may include former settlements.)

Adjacent townships
 Washington Township (north)
 Wayne Township, Marion County (northeast)
 Decatur Township, Marion County (east)
 Madison Township, Morgan County (southeast)
 Brown Township, Morgan County (south)
 Monroe Township, Morgan County (southwest)
 Liberty Township (west)

Cemeteries
The township contains seven cemeteries: Fairfield Friends, Indiana Boys School, Lick Branch, Maple Hill, Ramsey, Sugar Grove and White Lick Friends.

Major highways
  Interstate 70
  U.S. Route 40
  State Road 67
  State Road 267

Education
Guilford Township residents may obtain a free library card from the Plainfield-Guilford Township Public Library in Plainfield.

References
 
 United States Census Bureau cartographic boundary files

External links

Townships in Hendricks County, Indiana
Townships in Indiana